Hanspeter Schild (born 21 April 1950) is a Swiss former footballer who played as a midfielder and made ten appearances for the Switzerland national team and scored two career goals.

Career
Schild made his debut for Switzerland on 20 October 1973 in a 1974 FIFA World Cup qualification match against Italy, which finished as a 0–2 loss. He went on to make ten appearances, scoring two goals, before making his last appearance on 3 September 1975 in a friendly match against England, which finished as a 1–2 loss.

Career statistics

International

International goals

References

External links
 
 
 

1950 births
Living people
Swiss men's footballers
Switzerland international footballers
Association football midfielders
BSC Young Boys players
Swiss Super League players